The DR Congo Super Cup is a Congolese association football competition, which takes place in an annual match between the Linafoot champion team and the winners of the DR Congo Cup.

Finals

References

External links
RSSSF.com

Super Cup